William Cecil Wood (1904–1961) was an English footballer who played as a goalkeeper for Rochdale. He was also on the reserve teams for Manchester City and Newcastle United.

References

1904 births
1961 deaths
Rochdale A.F.C. players
Manchester City F.C. players
Newcastle United F.C. players
Footballers from Manchester
English footballers
Association football goalkeepers